The Rabbi Alexander S. Gross Hebrew Academy, is a coeducational, yeshiva and college preparatory, Zionistic, private, Modern Orthodox Jewish day school, located in Miami Beach, Florida. The school has been awarded a Blue Ribbon School of Excellence.

History 

Rabbi Alexander S. Gross founded the school in 1947 and was instrumental in its development as the first Orthodox Jewish Day School south of Baltimore. The Hebrew Academy serves a diverse Jewish community that is reflective of South Florida.

Beginning with just six students in first grade, the Hebrew Academy has grown over the years to a student body of approximately 600 students. It provides education for children ranging from 6 weeks of age through grade 12. Students complete daily coursework in conversational Hebrew, the study of Chumash, Talmud, and Judaic history. In addition to a full Judaic curriculum, students are also receive instruction in college preparatory math, language arts, science, and social studies, with opportunities to participate in Advanced Placement and college level courses. Graduates of the Hebrew Academy subsequently attend universities and yeshivot worldwide. Hebrew Academy is the only religious, Zionistic, and college preparatory school in Miami-Dade County.

Athletics 

As members of the Florida High School Athletic Association (FHSAA), students compete at the 2A level in organized sports against other private schools in girls and boys volleyball, girls and boys basketball, girls and boys soccer, girls and boys tennis, girls and boys flag football, and girls and boys cross country. There are clubs, shabbatonim, school field trips, and other activities that provide students with a full school life.

The Varsity Basketball program began under Coach Robert "Bob" King and Assistant Coach Jonathan Grossman in the 1981-1982 school year.  The first basket in RASG Varsity history was scored in the St. Patrick's gym by freshman Rich Scharlat on a pass from senior Jay Schechter. Avi Littwin, Bernie Schuster, and Gil Neuman also played significant roles for the varsity that year.

In 2013, standout basketball player Ellis Greenstein, led the Warriors to a FHSAA JV Championship and received MVP honors for averaging 16.7 points a game and 5.9 assists per game.  Fellow Players Nathan Miller, Mikey Shakib, and Caleb Katz, played large roles in helping the Warriors make it to the Big stage.

The Warrior Girls Varsity Basketball team has won District Championships for the 2011, 2012, 2013 and 2014 years. Additionally, the Boys Varsity Basketball team won the Tier 2 Championship at Yeshiva University's Serachek Tournament in 2016.

Recently, Hebrew Academy Junior, Ben Tal, was named Underclassman of the Year and was placed on the 1st Team by All Jewish Hoops America. An Honorable Mention was also received by Junior, Jack Esformes.

Honors 

In 2008 Miami-Dade County Commission Chairman Bruno A. Barreiro presented the "Key to the County" to several families and individuals who have made significant contributions to Rabbi Alexander S. Gross (RASG) Hebrew Academy. During the award it was also noted that the Hebrew Academy was "Launched in 1947, the RASG Hebrew Academy is the oldest Jewish Day School in the state of Florida... The presentation was part of the 60th Anniversary Diamond Dinner celebration where Sumner Redstone, the executive chairman of the Board for Viacom and CBS delivered the keynote speech and received a "Distinguished Visitor" recognition."

Several educators associated with the school have won notable awards: "Rabbi Chaim Benhamou of the Rabbi Alexander S. Gross Hebrew Academy... a Bible, Talmud, Philosophy, and Art teacher for 9th – 12 grade students at the Rabbi Alexander S. Gross Hebrew Academy on Miami Beach" won the 2007 Grinspoon-Steinhardt Awards for Excellence in Jewish Education sponsored by the Jewish Life Network of Michael Steinhardt.

Notable alumni
Shmuley Boteach, rabbi, author, TV host, and public speaker.

References

External links 
 Official Hebrew Academy Website

Jews and Judaism in Miami Beach, Florida
Orthodox yeshivas in the United States
Modern Orthodox Jewish day schools in the United States
Educational institutions established in 1947
Private K-12 schools in Miami-Dade County, Florida
Buildings and structures in Miami Beach, Florida
1947 establishments in Florida
Zionism in the United States